Esgeiriau Gwynion (Welsh for "white shanks") is a mountain in north Wales. It is the smallest of the three Marilyns that form the Aran range, the others being Aran Fawddwy and Glasgwm.

The peak is situated to the east of Aran Fawddwy, separated by Bwlch Sirddyn, and stretches right the way round Cwn Cynllwyd towards the Berwyn range at Foel y Geifr. The tops are all boggy in character, all rising from a wild, peat bog plateau. A road penetrates the plateau at Bwlch y Groes.

References

Llanuwchllyn
Mawddwy
Mountains and hills of Gwynedd
Mountains and hills of Snowdonia
Hewitts of Wales
Marilyns of Wales
Nuttalls